The Copa América 1989 football tournament was hosted by Brazil, from 1 to 16 July. All ten CONMEBOL member nations participated.

Brazil won their fourth Copa América, and first since 1949, by beating Uruguay 1–0 in the final match at the Estádio do Maracanã. This achievement ended a 19-year streak without official titles for the Brazilians. The last one had been in the 1970 World Cup. The final match between Brazil and Uruguay on Maracanã Stadium also marks exactly 39 years, on another 16 July since the FIFA World Cup 1950 Final.

The top scorer was Brazilian Bebeto. He scored six times, including three in the final group stage.

Venues

Squads
For a complete list of all participating squads, see: 1989 Copa América squads

First round
The tournament was set up in two groups of five teams each. Each team played one match against each of the other teams within the same group. The top two teams in each group advanced to the final stage.

Two points were awarded for a win, one point for a draw, and no points for a loss.

 Tie-breaker
 If teams finish leveled on points, the following tie-breakers are used:
 greater goal difference in all group games;
 greater number of goals scored in all group games;
 winner of the head-to-head match between the teams in question;
 drawing of lots.

Group A

Group B

Final round

Result

Goal scorers
With six goals, Bebeto was the top scorer in the tournament. In total, 55 goals were scored by 30 different players, with only one of them credited as own goal.

6 goals
  Bebeto

4 goals
  Rubén Sosa
  Carlos Maldonado

3 goals
  Romário
  Arnoldo Iguarán

2 goals

  Claudio Caniggia
  Juvenal Olmos
  Buenaventura Ferreira
  Adolfino Cañete
  Alfredo Mendoza
  Gustavo Neffa
  Jorge Hirano
  Antonio Alzamendi
  Enzo Francescoli
  Santiago Ostolaza

1 goal

  Baltazar
  Geovani
  Fernando Astengo
  Juan Carlos Letelier
  Jaime Pizarro
  Jaime Ramírez
  Óscar Reyes
  Antony de Ávila
  René Higuita
  Ney Avilés
  Ermen Benítez
  Franco Navarro
  Juan Reynoso
  Rubén Paz

Own goal
  José del Solar

External links
 Copa América 1989 at RSSSF

 
Copa América tournaments
International association football competitions hosted by Brazil
Copa América
1989 in South American football
July 1989 sports events in South America
Sport in Recife
Sport in Goiânia
Sport in Salvador, Bahia
International sports competitions in Rio de Janeiro (city)
20th century in Rio de Janeiro